Ardo Kreek (born 7 August 1986) is an Estonian volleyball player, a member of Estonia men's national volleyball team and French club Arago de Sète.

Club career
Kreek was born in Tallinn and started his career in his hometown club Sylvester Tallinn at the age of 17. In 2006 he moved to Estonian powerhouse VK Selver Tallinn where he played for the next three years. With Selver he won the Estonian Championship, the Estonian Cup and the Schenker League title twice. Selver and Kreek also reached to CEV Challenge Cup quarterfinals in 2008.

In the beginning of 2009 Kreek played half a season in France, for Rennes Volley 35. In September 2009 he moved to Poland and signed with PlusLiga top team Asseco Resovia Rzeszów. He left the team in December and joined another Polish team Jadar Radom where he played the rest of the 2009–10 season. Kreek stayed in Poland for the next two seasons playing in the AZS Politechnika Warszawska team. With Politechnika he reached the CEV Challenge Cup finals in 2012 where they lost to another Polish team AZS Częstochowa in the golden set.

In 2012 Kreek signed with French top team Paris Volley. With Paris team he has reached the French Pro A finals four times between 2013 and 2016 winning the French Championship in 2016. Kreek and Paris Volley also won the 2013–14 CEV Cup by defeating Russian team Guberniya Nizhniy Novgorod in the finals. Kreek left Paris after eight seasons and signed with another Pro A team Arago de Sète in Southern France.

National team
Kreek represented the Estonian youth teams in the U18 and U20 level. He is a member of the Estonian national team since 2004 and has represented Estonia at the 2009, 2011, 2015, 2017 and 2019 European Volleyball Championships. With the national team Kreek won the 2016 European Volleyball League title.

Sporting achievements

Clubs
CEV Cup
  2013/2014 – with Paris Volley

CEV Challenge Cup
  2011/2012 – with AZS Politechnika Warszawska

Baltic League
  2006/2007 – with Selver Tallinn
  2007/2008 – with Selver Tallinn

National championship
 2003/2004  Estonian Championship, with Sylvester Tallinn
 2004/2005  Estonian Championship, with Sylvester Tallinn
 2005/2006  Estonian Championship, with Sylvester Tallinn
 2006/2007  Estonian Championship, with Selver Tallinn
 2007/2008  Estonian Championship, with Selver Tallinn
 2012/2013  French Championship, with Paris Volley
 2013/2014  French Championship, with Paris Volley
 2014/2015  French Championship, with Paris Volley
 2015/2016  French Championship, with Paris Volley

National cup
 2006/2007  Estonian Cup 2006, with Selver Tallinn
 2007/2008  Estonian Cup 2007, with Selver Tallinn
 2008/2009  Estonian Cup 2008, with Selver Tallinn
 2013/2014  French SuperCup 2013, with Paris Volley
 2013/2014  French Cup 2014, with Paris Volley
 2014/2015  French SuperCup 2014, with Paris Volley
 2015/2016  French SuperCup 2015, with Paris Volley
 2016/2017  French SuperCup 2016, with Paris Volley

National team
 2016  European League
 2021  European League

Individual
 2013 Estonian Volleyball Player of the Year
 2014 Estonian Volleyball Player of the Year
 2015 European League – Best Middle Blocker
 2019 French Ligue B – Most Valuable Player
 2019 French Ligue B – Best Middle Blocker

References

External links

Player profile on the FIVB official site
Player profile on the CEV official site

1986 births
Living people
Sportspeople from Tallinn
Estonian men's volleyball players
Estonian expatriate volleyball players
Estonian expatriate sportspeople in France
Estonian expatriate sportspeople in Poland
Expatriate volleyball players in France
Expatriate volleyball players in Poland
Jadar Radom players
Projekt Warsaw players
Paris Volley players
Resovia (volleyball) players